William F. Lukes (February 19, 1847 – December 13, 1923) was a United States Navy sailor and a recipient of America's highest military decoration—the Medal of Honor—for his actions in the 1871 Korean Expedition.

Biography
William F. Lukes enlisted in the U.S. Navy from Tianjin, China and served as a Landsman on board  in Company D as part of the Korean Expedition. On June 11, 1871, during the capture of the Han River forts on Ganghwa Island, the leader of the American attack, Lieutenant Hugh McKee, was mortally wounded. Landsman Lukes and two other sailors, Seth Allen and Thomas Murphy, attempted to rescue Lt. McKee but encountered heavy resistance. In the course of the ensuing hand-to-hand fight, Allen and Murphy were killed. Lukes suffered a severe cut to the head but continued to fight; he survived the engagement. When reinforcements arrived, they found Lukes unconscious, with 18 bayonet wounds, lying over the body of Lieutenant McKee. Lukes remained unconscious aboard the Colorado for 39 days. For his actions on that occasion, Lukes was specially mentioned by his commanding officer for conspicuous "coolness and bravery during the desperate fight" and awarded the Medal of Honor.

Before leaving the Navy, William Lukes obtained the rank of Seaman. Lukes suffered convulsions due to brain injury for the rest of his life. He died at the age of 76 and is buried in Los Angeles National Cemetery, Los Angeles, California.

Medal of Honor citation
Rank and organization: Landsman, U.S. Navy. Born: 1846, Bohemia. Enlisted at: Tientsin, China. G.O. No.: 180, October 10, 1872. 

Citation:
Served with Company D during the capture of the Korean forts, 9 and 10 June 1871. Fighting the enemy inside the fort, Lukes received a severe cut over the head.

See also

 List of Medal of Honor recipients

Notes

References
 
 
 
 

19th-century American people
19th-century Czech people
United States Navy sailors
United States Navy Medal of Honor recipients
Foreign-born Medal of Honor recipients
American people of Czech descent
Austro-Hungarian emigrants to the United States
People from Liberec District
1847 births
1923 deaths
Burials at Los Angeles National Cemetery
Korean Expedition (1871) recipients of the Medal of Honor